St. George's Chapel at Chatham, Medway, Kent is a chapel in an area that used to be Chatham Dockyard known as HMS Pembroke, used by the Royal Navy for centuries. It is notable for its naval connections.

It is Grade II listed and is built to a similar design to the chapel at HMS Drake, Plymouth. Now known as HMNB Devonport.

The foundation stone of St. George's Chapel, Chatham within the Barracks was laid on 27 April 1905 and on completion, was dedicated by the Lord Bishop of Rochester John Harmer, as St George's Church on 19 December 1906.

St. George's remains a naval memorial centre, managed by the Local Authority, and is rich with windows and memorials dedicated to naval personnel. One example is a stained glass window that was unveiled by Queen Elizabeth (then Princess Elizabeth) on 29 October 1950, to commemorate Chatham-based ships that were lost in World War II.

On 29 March 2013, BBC Radio 4's Any Questions? was broadcast from the chapel. It was presented by Ritula Shah and guests include; Tom Newton Dunn, the political editor of The Sun newspaper, Clare Gerada (GP and medical director of the NHS Practitioner Health Programme), Lord Trimble (Irish Politician) and Angela Eagle (Labour Party MP).

Meetings of Medway Council are now held in the chapel.

References

See also
 Saint George: Devotions, traditions and prayers

Church of England church buildings in Kent
Saint George